HEC-1 is software that was developed by the US Army Corps of Engineers to estimate river flows as a result of rainfall.  It was written in the FORTRAN language and until 1984 could only be run on a mainframe computer.

When desktop computers became popular the program was ported to the PC.  Engineers and scientists still use it today because of its ability to model a wide range of natural hydrologic systems.

References

External links
 HEC-1 website
 A Study of Hydrologic Simulation Models
 Army Hydrologic Engineering Center

Year of introduction missing
Fortran software
Hydrology software